The 2022 Liga 3 North Sumatra is the fifth edition of Liga 3 North Sumatra organized by Asprov PSSI Sumut.

Followed by 19 clubs. The winner of this competition will immediately advance to the national round.

PSDS is the defending champion after winning it in the 2021 season.

Teams 
2022 Liga 3 North Sumatra was attended by 19 teams.

First round

Group A

Group B

Group C

Group D

Knockout stage 
Wait for the completion of the group stage first.

References 

2022 in Indonesian football
Seasons in Asian third tier association football leagues
Liga 3 (Indonesia) seasons
Sport in North Sumatra